Samtrygd was an insurance company based in Oslo, Norway.

It was founded as Samtrygd, Norsk Gjensidige Forsikringsforening in 1922 as a reinsurance company for 260 smaller fire treasuries. From 1958 it developed several types of general insurance. It shared manager with the car insurance Norsk Bilforsikring Gjensidige for many years, merging in 1974. In the same year, it started a cooperation with the life insurance company Livsforsikringsselskapet Gjensidige, and in 1976 the Gjensidige name and logo became the sole in use.

CEOs and chairs
The chief executives and board chairmen of Samtrygd were:

Chief executives
1922-1941: Hjalmar Steenstrup
1941-1958: A. H. Andersen
1958: Rolf Løchen (acting)
1958-1984: Jæger Dokk (from 1976 in Gjensidige Skade)

Chairs
1922-1934: Rasmus Mortensen
1935-1943: Johan E. Mellbye
1943-1946: Kristoffer Skraastad
1946-1959: Arne Bull
1959-1961: Ottar Opsand
1961-1969: Søren Folvik
1969-: Ola T. Ruud

References

Insurance companies of Norway
Companies based in Oslo
Financial services companies established in 1922
1922 establishments in Norway
Financial services companies disestablished in 1976